Web literacy comprises the skills and competencies needed for reading, writing and participating on the web. It has been described as "both content and activity" – i.e., web users should not just learn about the web but also about how to make their own website.

History of the concept
In the latter part of the 1990s, literacy researchers started to explore the differences between printed text and the network-enabled devices with screens. This research was largely focused on two areas: the credibility of information that can be found on the World Wide Web and the difference that hypertext makes to 'reading' and 'writing'. These skills were included in definitions of information literacy and included in a SCONUL position paper in 1999. This paper became the '7 Pillars of Information Literacy', which was last updated in 2011.

Web Literacy Map

The Mozilla Foundation is a non-profit organization that promotes openness, innovation and participation on the Internet. It has created a Web Literacy Map in consultation with a community of stakeholders from formal and informal education, as well as industry. Web literacy is described as "the skills and competencies needed for reading, writing and participating on the web". Work on what was originally entitled a Web Literacy 'Standard' began in early 2013. Version 1.0 was launched at the Mozilla Festival later that year. Going forward, 'standard' was seen to be problematic and against the ethos of what the Mozilla community was trying to achieve.

Literacy Version 1.1 of the Web Literacy Map was released in early 2014 and underpins the Mozilla Foundation's Webmaker resources section, where learners and mentors can find activities that help teach related areas. Although the Web Literacy Map is a list of strands, skills and competencies, it is most commonly represented as a competency grid.

The Mozilla community finalised the version 1.5 of the Web Literacy Map at the end of March 2015. This involves small changes to the competencies layer and a comprehensive review of the skills they contain.

Exploring

(Navigating the Web)
 Navigation (Using software tools to browse the web)
 Web Mechanics (Understanding the web ecosystem)
 Search (Locating information, people and resources via the web)
 Credibility (Critically evaluating information found on the web)
 Security (Keeping systems, identities, and content safe)

Building

(Creating the Web)
 Composing for the Web (Creating and curating content)
 Remixing (Modifying existing web resources to create something new)
 Design & Accessibility (Creating universally effective communications through web resources)
 Coding/Scripting (Creating interactive experiences on the web)
 Infrastructure (Understanding the Internet stack)

Connecting

(Participating on the Web)
 Sharing (Creating web resources with others)
 Collaborating (Providing access to web resources)
 Community Participation (Getting involved in web communities and understanding their practices)
 Privacy (Examining the consequences of sharing data online)
 Open Practices (Helping to keep the web democratic and universally accessible)

See also
 Cyber self-defense
 Computer literacy
 Digital literacy
 Information literacy

References

Literacy
Computing and society
World Wide Web